Anwar Group of Industries is one of the largest and oldest Bangladeshi conglomerates. It consists of 18 subsidiaries that are servicing consumer goods, steels, cement, textile, finance and automotive industry. Manwar Hossain is the Chairman of Anwar Group.

History 
Anwar Group started as a hides and skins business in 1834, founded by Lakku Mia, an entrepreneur in British India. It is the biggest company in the construction industry of Bangladesh. Hossain Akhtar was the first chairman of the group.

In 1985, Anwar Galvanizing Limited started production galvanized iron fittings in Bangladesh, the first company to make them in the country.

In June 2009, AG Automobiles became the official partner of Ford Motor Company in Bangladesh and launched the first Ford showroom in Uttara.

In 2015, Anwar Cement announced plans to more than double the sales of cement sheets from 1 billion BDT to 2.5 billion BDT.

On 11 April 2021, Bd Finance of Anwar Group signed an agreement with Sovereign Infrastructure Group at the Bangladesh Embassy to the United States. Anwar Galvanizing announced plans to double their production through investing 270 BDT in the project.

Anwar Hossain was the chairman of the group. After his death on 17 August 2021, his son, Manwar Hossain, replaced him as chairman of Anwar Group on 14 September 2021. He had been the managing director of the company before the death of his father. In December 2021, Toledo Motors Limited became the official partner of Jeep in Bangladesh and launched their showroom in Uttara.

List of companies

Consumer goods
 A1 Polymer Ltd.
 Anwar Galvanizing Ltd.
 Jute Spinning Mills Ltd/ Anwar Jute Division.
 Athena’s Furniture & Home décor

Cement
 Anwar Cement Ltd.
 Anwar Cement Sheet Ltd.

Textile
 Anwar Textile Ltd.
 Mahmud Industries Private Ltd.
 Anwar Silk Mills Ltd.
 Hossain Dyeing & Printing Mills Ltd.

Steel
 Anwar Ispat Ltd.

Real estate
 Anwar Landmark Ltd.
 Anwar Infrastructure Ltd.

Finance
 City Insurance Company Ltd.
 Bangladesh Finance And Investment Company Ltd. (BD Finance)
 BD Finance Capital Holdings Ltd.
 BD Securities.
 City General Insurance Co. Ltd

Automobile
 AG Automobiles Ltd. (AG Auto)
 Toledo Motors Ltd (authorized distributor of Jeep in Bangladesh)

See also
 List of companies of Bangladesh

References

External links
 Anwar Group of Industries information

1834 establishments in India
Conglomerate companies of Bangladesh
Organisations based in Dhaka